The Brisbane City Cobras are one of 13 Touch Football permits within Australia.  Covering metropolitan Brisbane, the region is covers only a relatively small number of local associations, but has performed strongly at national events, in particular the Australian National Touch League.

The Brisbane City Cobras region includes the Redcliffe Touch Association, the Brisbane Metropolitan Touch Association, the UniTouch Association and the Southern Cross Touch Association.

At the National Touch League competition Cobras have captured a number of national titles, most notably in the Women's Open Division.

As a region Cobras have produced Australian Touch Hall of Fame members Terry Jacks (player) and  Peter Bell (coaching), Australian coach Gary Madders, as well as notable Australian National representative players Catherine Bell, Angela Barr, Kelly Woods, Katie Curtis, Mary Steele, Trent McDonald, Craig Madders, Gavin McDonald, Shane Duell, Brenton O'Shaunessy and Peter Stoddart.

References

Cary J Thompson Thompson's Touch Almanac 2006

Related links

National Touch League (NTL)
NTL Championships

External links
Brisbane City Cobras
Australian Touch Website

Touch teams
Rugby league teams in Brisbane
Sporting clubs in Brisbane